Glitter is an American drama television series broadcast by the ABC network from September 13 to December 25, 1984.

The series was produced by Aaron Spelling and was set behind the scenes of a top entertainment magazine titled Glitter, and attempted to combine the urgency of journalism and business politics with the glamorous lifestyles of the rich and famous featured in the pages of the magazine. The leading cast members were David Birney, Morgan Brittany, Christopher Mayer, Dianne Kay, and Arthur Hill.

The format of the series was similar to two other popular ABC shows, which were also produced by Aaron Spelling; The Love Boat and Hotel, in that each week it featured high-profile guest appearances from famous celebrities, including Ginger Rogers and Cyd Charisse.  Unlike the other shows, Glitter was not a ratings success. It was scheduled on Thursday nights against Simon & Simon, Cheers, and Night Court, which were all among the top-20 most-watched programs at that time. The first three episodes aired in September 1984, and then the show was taken off the air (though was still in production) until December 1984, when three more episodes were shown. Ratings did not improve and the series was cancelled. The remaining eight episodes were shown during December 1985 as part of ABC's late-night line-up.

Despite its lack of success in the US, Glitter was sold internationally. It was shown in the UK on BBC1 in the summer of 1985 (though not all episodes were shown).

Cast
David Birney as Sam Dillon
Morgan Brittany as Kate Simpson
Dianne Kay as Jennifer Douglas
Dorian Harewood as Earl Tobin
Christopher Mayer as Pete Bozak
Melinda Culea as Terry Randolph
Timothy Patrick Murphy as Chip Craddock
Tracy Nelson as Angela Timini
Arte Johnson as Clive Richlin
Barbara Sharma as Shelley Sealy
Arthur Hill as Charles Hardwick

Episodes

External links
  (pilot)
  (series)

1984 American television series debuts
1984 American television series endings
American television soap operas
American primetime television soap operas
American Broadcasting Company original programming
Television series by CBS Studios
Television series by Spelling Television
English-language television shows
Television shows set in New York City